Telebasis is a genus of  damselflies in the family Coenagrionidae. The genus occurs in the Neotropics. Most of the species are red with a few blue species in South America.

This genus contains the following species:

References

Coenagrionidae
Zygoptera genera
Taxa named by Edmond de Sélys Longchamps